The Voice TV Bulgaria (usually known as simply The Voice) is a Bulgarian music channel. It currently airs music videos during most of the day, but it is probable that it will start producing more local shows in the future.

The channel was formerly known as Veselina TV (named after Radio Veselina). In 2006, the Luxembourg-based SBS Broadcasting Group acquired Radio Veselina, and in October 2006, Veselina TV was rebranded as The Voice TV, after the music channels in the Nordic countries.

On November 10, 2011, ProSiebenSat.1 Group sold all its Bulgarian radio stations and the music channel, The Voice TV, to A.E. Best Success Services Bulgaria EOOD.

Frequencies:

Sofia 96.2 MHz

Plovdiv 106.0 MHz 
Kardjali 107.5 MHz

Karnobat 93.3 MHz

Smoljan 88.2 MHz

Pomorie 98.7 MHz

TV Programmes 

The Voice Top 10
- Airplay Chart
- The Voice Top 100
- Dance Top 30
- 1 Artist, 3 Hits
- NEW4U
- Deja Voice
- Wishlist
- Your Voice
- Hip Hop & RnB
- The Voice Party
- The Voice of Alternative
- The Voice of Winter
- The Voice of Summer
- ZOOM
- We Love Music
- Snooza
- In The Mix
- CloseUp
- Planet Voice
- Kiss The Voice
- Sundown
- The Voice Weekend
- BG Voice Top 10
- The Voice Choice

External links
 Official site

References and footnotes

Television networks in Bulgaria
Bulgarian-language television stations
ProSiebenSat.1 Media
Television channels and stations established in 2003
Radio stations established in 2007

bg:The voice
de:The Voice TV